The 2016 season is Penangs 90th competitive season, 1st season in the top flight of Malaysian football since promoted in 2015, and 95th year in existence as a football club. The season covers the period from 31 December 2015 to 31 October 2016.

Squad

First-team squad

Transfers

1st leg

In:

Out:

2nd leg

In:

Out:

References

2016
Malaysian football clubs 2016 season
Penang F.C.